Nico Diago Gordon (born 28 April 2002) is an English professional footballer who plays as a defender or midfielder for  club Birmingham City.

Life and career
Gordon was born in Birmingham and attended St Thomas Aquinas Catholic School in the Kings Norton district. He joined Birmingham City in 2014, and took up a two-year scholarship with their Academy in July 2018. According to coach Steve Spooner, Gordon "can play anywhere across the back and midfield. He's currently at centre-half. He's an excellent reader of the game. He steps in and can find passes. He played for the 18s last year and has started this season very well."

He made his competitive debut for Birmingham's development squad team in August 2019, playing at right back in a 1–1 draw with Crystal Palace U23, and became a regular in the side. He also captained the under-18 team as they reached the fifth round of the 2019–20 FA Youth Cup. Gordon was given a first-team squad number early in 2020, he was 19th man for the FA Cup replay against Coventry City, and in April 2020, the club confirmed that he had been made an offer of a three-year professional contract, with the option of a fourth year. He signed the contract on 26 June.

When the 2019–20 EFL Championship season resumed after its COVID-19 pandemic-related suspension, Gordon was one of several youngsters named on the bench for Birmingham's first match under the temporary rules. He remained unused, but made his Football League debut in the next fixture, on 27 June 2020 at home to Hull City, replacing the injured Jake Clarke-Salter after 87 minutes wth his team 3–2 down; the match finished 3–3. Gordon was given his first start on 12 July away to Stoke City, playing on the left of three centre backs and facing the powerful Tyrese Campbell. With Stoke 2–0 up at half-time, caretaker head coach Spooner changed to a back four, and Gordon was more comfortable at left back; the score remained 2–0. He played once more that season, and a further twice at the end of the following season, when, with relegation avoided, new manager Lee Bowyer used the last two fixtures to look at fringe players. Both were heavy defeats, though the Birmingham Mails reporter thought he "did OK against one of the better attacking forces in the league" in the 5–2 defeat to Blackburn Rovers.

Gordon was Birmingham's man of the match in the EFL Cup win against Colchester United in August 2021. Partnering George Friend in central defence, he "show[ed] great composure and strength, while he was sound in possession and with his passing", but was injured late in the game and did not re-appear even for the under-23 team until the following February. He started the Championship match away to Bristol City on 5 March, alongside Marc Roberts at centre back, scored his first senior goal with an accurate header from Jordan Graham's corner to put his side 2–0 ahead, and played the full 90 minutes as Birmingham held on for a 2–1 win. He kept his place for the next match despite loanee Teden Mengi's return to fitness, "more than held his own, often sweeping behind Roberts when danger demanded it" as the team kept a clean sheet against Hull City, and the Mail reporter suggested that if he continued in similar vein, "he could well save Blues a recruitment job in the summer."

Career statistics

References

2002 births
Living people
Footballers from Birmingham, West Midlands
English footballers
Association football defenders
Association football midfielders
Birmingham City F.C. players
English Football League players
Black British sportsmen